During the 17th Canadian Parliament, the number of sitting women senators increased. Ten women ran for seats in the Canadian House of Commons in the 1930 federal election but Agnes Macphail, first elected in 1921, continued to be the only woman elected. Cairine Wilson continued to sit as a member of the Senate.

In July 1935, Iva Campbell Fallis became the second woman named to the Canadian senate.

Party Standings

Members of the House of Commons

Senators

References 

Lists of women politicians in Canada